This is a list of flags used in the Kingdom of the Netherlands. For more information about the national flag, visit the article Flag of the Netherlands.

National flag

Constituent countries

Provinces and public bodies

Provinces

Historical flags

Public bodies

City flags

Flags of Dutch regions without administrative status 

For flags of former municipalities, see List of former municipal flags of the Netherlands.

Royal family

Royal standard

Other members of the royal family

Dutch governors

Military and naval flags

Historical

Royal standards

Other members of the Royal Family

Dutch governors

House flags

References

 
Netherlands
Flags